Privolye is a rural locality (a selo) in Medvezhenskoye Rural Settlement, Semiluksky District, Voronezh Oblast, Russia. The population was 51 as of 2010. There are 3 streets.

Geography 
Privolye is located on the Kamyshovka River, 20 km northwest of Semiluki (the district's administrative centre) by road. Razdolye is the nearest rural locality.

References 

Rural localities in Semiluksky District